Peruvian art has its origin in the Andean civilizations. These civilizations rose in the territory of modern Peru before the arrival of the Spanish.

Pre-Columbian art 

Peru's earliest artwork came from the Cupisnique culture, which was concentrated on the Pacific coast, and the Chavín culture, which was largely north of Lima between the Andean mountain ranges of the Cordillera Negra and the Cordillera Blanca. Decorative work from this era, approximately the 9th century BCE, was symbolic and religious in nature. The artists worked with gold, silver and ceramics to create a variety of sculpture and relief carvings. These civilizations were also known for their architecture and wood sculpture.

Between the 9th century BC and the 2st century CE, the Paracas Cavernas and Paracas Necropolis cultures developed on the south coast of Peru. Paracas Cavernas produced complex polychrome and monochrome ceramics with religious representations. Burials from the Paracas Necropolis also yielded complex textiles, many produced with sophisticated geometric patterns.

The 3rd century BCE saw the flowering of the urban culture, Moche, in the Lambayeque region. The Mochica culture produced impressive architectural works, such as the Huacas del Sol y de la Luna and the Huaca Rajada of Sipan. They were expert at cultivation in terraces and hydraulic engineering and produced original ceramics, textiles, pictorial and sculptural works.

Another urban culture, the Wari civilization, flourished between the 8th and 12th centuries in Ayacucho. Their centralized town planning was extended to other areas, such as Pachacamac, Cajamarquilla and Wari Willka.

Between the 9th and 13th centuries CE, the military urban Tiwanaku empire rose by the borders of Lake Titicaca. Centered around a city of the same name in modern-day Bolivia, the Tiwanaku introduced stone architecture and sculpture of a monumental type. These works of architecture and art were made possible by the Tiwanaku's developing bronze, which enabled them to make the necessary tools.

Urban architecture reached a new height between the 14th and 15th centuries in the Chimú Culture. The Chimú built the city of Chan Chan in the valley of the Moche river, in La Libertad. The Chimú were skilled goldsmiths and created remarkable works of hydraulic engineering.

The Inca Civilization, which united Peru under its hegemony in the centuries immediately preceding the Spanish conquest, incorporated into their own works a great part of the cultural legacy of the civilizations which preceded it. Important relics of their artwork and architecture can be seen in cities like Cusco, architectural remains like Sacsahuaman and Machu Picchu and stone pavements that united Cusco with the rest of the Inca Empire.

Colonial art
Peruvian sculpture and painting began to define themselves from the ateliers founded by monks, who were strongly influenced by the Sevillian Baroque School. In this context, the stalls of the Cathedral choir, the fountain of the Main Square of Lima both by Pedro de Noguera, and a great part of the colonial production were registered. The first center of art established by the Spanish was the Cuzco School that taught Quechua artists European painting styles. Diego Quispe Tito (1611-1681) was one of the first members of the Cuzco school and Marcos Zapata (1710-1773) was one of the last.

Painting of this time reflected a synthesis of European and indigenous influences, as is evident in the portrait of prisoner Atahualpa, by D. de Mora or in the canvases of the Italians Mateo Pérez de Alesio and Angelino Medoro, the Spaniards Francisco Bejarano and J. de Illescas and the Creole J. Rodriguez.

During the 17th and 18th centuries, the Baroque Style also dominated the field of plastic arts.

The image of Mary in Our Lady of Bethlehem hosts a lot of European styling and representations of the Western Mary. She is elevated from the ground, and is wearing a crown and has the faint image of a circular halo behind her head. She is being presented as cherubic figures pull back drapery, as if she is being "showcased." Surrounding her are small cherubic heads, often referred to as "puti's" in Southern American culture. They represent the innocence of children and act as a nod to her maternity and Jesus. She is dresses in obvious western, high-culture garments - highly adorned. Even the infant Christ is portrayed in western apparel.

19th century

In the 19th century, French neoclassic and romantic currents es in L. Montero, Ignacio Merino, Daniel Hernández Morillo and Francisco Masias.

Modern and contemporary

Indigenous movement
The establishment of the Fine Arts School of Lima (1919) had a decisive influence on Peruvian sculpture and painting.

In sculpture, some of the most remarkable artists include Luis Agurto, L. Valdettaro, Joaquin Roca Rey, J. Piqueras, Alberto Guzmán, Victor Delfín and F. Sánchez. Among the painters, Daniel Hernández, R. Grau, Cesar Quispez Asin and Jose Sabogal are particularly notable. Sabogal headed the indigenous movement, which was one of the main influences on Peruvian contemporary painting. Among the most notable painters in the indigenous movement was Julia Codesido. Some of the most widely recognized painters are Fernando de Szyszlo, Alberto Davila, Armando Villegas, Sabino Springett, Bernardo Rivero, J. Alberto Tello Montalvo, Victor Humareda, M. A. Cuadros, Ángel Chávez, Milner Cajahuaringa, Arturo Kubotta, Venancio Shinki, Alberto Quintanilla (wiki Es), G. Chávez, Tilsa Tsuchiya, David Herskowitz, Oscar Allain, Carlos Revilla, Sérvulo Gutiérrez and Amilcar Salomon Zorrilla (Peru).

In the field of photography, Martín Chambi made major contributions.

Contemporary Art 
Teresa Burga was a multimedia artist that works with conceptual art since the 60s and 70s. She was a pioneer in media art, art and technology and installation art in Peru. She was one of the most important non-objectualist artists of those decades in Peru.

In sculpture Cristina Gálvez was one of the most influential artists and art educators.
In the 1980s after the art festival Contacta 1979 the group Huayco was created by Charo Noriega, Mariella Zevallos, Maria Luy, Armando Williams, Herbert Rodriguez and Juan Javier Salazar. This group appropriated the means of production and iconography of popular aesthetics. 
Within the history of Contemporary Art in Peru the Third Biennial of Trujilo in 1990 played an important role. This biennial included local artists as well as artists from neighboring countries. Jorge Eduardo Eielson and Jorge Piqueras were among the exhibiting artists that returned to Peru from Europe to participate within this biennial. It was the last biennial in Trujillo. In 1992 the artist Jaime Higa presented an exhibition at The Museum of Italian Art in Lima curated by Gustavo Buntinx. The 80s were marked by the civil war and artists responded to the political situation. Among these artists are Eduardo Tokeshi, Ricardo Wiesse and Alfredo Marquez.
Later on in 1997 the First Ibero American Biennial was produced in Lima directed by Luis Lama. This biennial allowed for the exchange of ideas and a wider exposure for Peruvian artists. A memorable moment within this biennial was the unexpected performance by Elena Tejada-Herrera, which became an milestone within the history of Peruvian performance art. In 1999 Tejada-Herrera was awarded the first prize in the contest Passport for and Artist with a performance for which she hired street sellers performing on the streets of Lima.
Another milestone in the history of contemporary Peruvian art is the Travestite Museum created by the philosopher and drag queen Giussepe Campuzano in 2003.

Folk art

Chulucanas pottery originates in the Piura Region. Inspired by pre-Incan ceramics, the bold, graphic pottery is now exported all over the world. Designs are varied, but are predominated by black and white. There are several bigger companies but a lot of small manufactures are in Chulucanas itself and in the nearby villages of Quatro Esquinas.

The Ayacucho Region is known for its retablos, or devotional paintings. San Pedro de Cajas in Ayacucho produces collectible looms. Cusco artistans create stuffed animals and dolls. Cochas-Huancayo is known for its gourd art.

Further reading
Americas Society, Art Gallery. Potosí: Colonial Treasures and the Bolivian City of Silver. New York 1997.
Banco Crédito del Peru. Colección arte y tesoros del Perú: Escultura en el Perú. Lima 1999.
Banco Crédito del Peru. Colección arte y tesoros del Perú: Pintura en el Virreinato del Perú. Lima 2001.
Banco Crédito del Peru. Colección arte y tesoros del Perú: Pintura mural en el sur andino. Lima 1999.
Banco Crédito del Peru. Colección arte y tesoros del Perú: Pintura virreynal. Lima 1973.
Benavente Velarde. Historia del arte cusqueño: Pintores cusqueños de la colonia. Cuzco 1995.
Castedo, Leopoldo. The Cuzco Circle. New York 1976.
Cummins, Thomas B.F. Toasts with the Inca: Andean Abstraction and Colonial Images on Quero Vessels. Ann Arbor 2002.
Damian, Carol. The Virgin of the Andes: Art and Ritual in Colonial Cuzco. Miami Beach 1995.
Dean, Carolyn. Inka Bodies and the Body of Christ: Corpus Christi in Colonial Cuzco, Peru. Durham: Duke University Press 1999.
Kennedy, Alexandra, ed. Arte de la Real Audiencia de Quito, siglos XVII-XIX. Quito 2002.
Museo del Arte de Lima. Art in Peru: works from the Collection of the Museo de Arte de Lima. Lima 2000.
Navarro, José Gabriel.  El arte en la provincia de Quito. Mexico City 1960.
Palmer, Gabrielle G. Sculpture in the Kingdom of Quito. Albuquerque: University of New Mexico Press 1987.
Urton, Gary. Signs of the Inka Khipu. Austin: University of Texas Press 2003.
Wethey, Harold E. Colonial Architecture and Sculpture in Peru. Cambridge MA 1949.

See also 
 List of Peruvian artists
 Latin American art

References

External links
Ancient Peruvian ceramics: the Nathan Cummings collection by Alan R. Sawyer, an exhibition catalog from The Metropolitan Museum of Art (fully available online as PDF), which contains material on Peruvian art

 
Art by country
Peruvian culture